Highball.TV is a Canadian subscription video on demand service, launched in 2018 by Melissa D'Agostino and Matthew Campagna. The service offers a curated selection of films, concentrating primarily on titles that have screened at various prestigious Canadian and international film festivals but have not otherwise received widespread commercial distribution, as well as a selection of original Canadian web series including Luba, Tactical Girls and Band Ladies.

The service is currently available on the web, as well as apps for Apple TV and Roku devices. Subscription rates are $7 per month, or $70 annually.

Original feature films
In 2021, HighballTV announced a $12-million slate of original feature films going into production over the following year that would feature women and BIPOC filmmakers in key creative roles.

References

External links

2018 establishments in Canada
Canadian video on demand services